Coccocypselum is a genus of flowering plants in the family Rubiaceae. It is native to Mexico, Central America, the West Indies and South America. All species of the genus Coccocypselum are herbaceous with fleshy, blue or purple fruits, and 4-petaled flowers.

Species

 Coccocypselum anomalum K.Schum. - Brazil
 Coccocypselum aureum (Spreng.) Cham.  & Schltdl. - from Cuba and Costa Rica south to Paraguay
 Coccocypselum bahiense C.B.Costa - Brazil (Bahia)
 Coccocypselum brevipetiolatum  Steyerm. - Venezuela, Bolivia, Colombia, Peru
 Coccocypselum capitatum (Graham) C.B.Costa & Mamede - Brazil 
 Coccocypselum condalia Pers. - from Trinidad and Costa Rica south to Paraguay
 Coccocypselum cordifolium Nees & Mart. - from Cuba and Veracruz (in eastern Mexico) south to Paraguay
 Coccocypselum erythrocephalum Cham.  & Schltdl. - Brazil, Paraguay
 Coccocypselum geophiloides Wawra - Brazil
 Coccocypselum glaberrimum Hadac - Cuba
 Coccocypselum glabrifolium Standl. - Brazil 
 Coccocypselum guianense (Aubl.) K.Schum. - from Cuba and Tabasco (in southern Mexico) south to Paraguay
 Coccocypselum hasslerianum Chodat - Bolivia, Paraguay, Brazil, Argentina 
 Coccocypselum herbaceum P.Browne ex Aubl. - Chiapas, Central America, Cuba, Jamaica, Hispaniola, Guyana, Venezuela, Colombia 
 Coccocypselum hirsutum Bartl. ex DC. - from Trinidad and Mexico south to Brazil
 Coccocypselum hispidulum (Standl.) Standl. - Costa Rica, Nicaragua, Panama, Colombia 
 Coccocypselum lanceolatum (Ruiz & Pav.) Pers. - from Cuba and Guatemala south to Paraguay
 Coccocypselum lymansmithii Standl. - Brazil, Paraguay
 Coccocypselum oblongatum Urb. - Cuba
 Coccocypselum ovatum Cham.  & Schltdl. - Brazil (possibly extinct)
 Coccocypselum pedunculare Cham.  & Schltdl. - Brazil 
 Coccocypselum pulchellum Cham. - Brazil, Argentina

References

Rubiaceae genera
Coussareeae
Flora of Central America
Flora of South America
Flora of the Caribbean